The 2nd Guards Field Artillery Regiment (German: 2. Garde-Feldartillerie-Regiment) was an artillery unit in the Prussian Army prior to and during the First World War. The regiment was part of the 4th Guards Infantry Division.

See also
List of Imperial German artillery regiments

References 

Artillery regiments of Germany
Regiments of the German Army in World War I
Guards regiments of Germany